Extra Playful is a 2011 EP by John Cale. The EP features 5 previously unreleased songs. Black Edition (released on Black Friday) contains two more extra songs.

Track listing
All songs composed and arranged by John Cale
"Catastrofuk" - 3:58
"Whaddya Mean by That?" - 5:39
"Hey Ray" - 4:16
"Pile a L'heure" - 3:38
"Perfection" - 4:01
"Bluetooth Swings" - 4:39 (Black Edition only)
"The Hanging" - 4:16 (Black Edition only)

Personnel
 John Cale − vocals, guitar, bass, keyboards, viola, synthesizer
 Dustin Boyer − guitar, synthesizer, background vocals
 Michael Jerome − drums, percussion, background vocals
 Erik Sanko − bass, background vocals
 Deantoni Parks − drums in "Whaddya Mean by That?"
 Noelle Scaggs − background vocals in "Hey Ray"
 Destani Wolf − background vocals in "Hey Ray"
Technical
Nita Scott - executive producer
Dustin Boyer - recording
Mickey Petralia - mixing

References 

John Cale EPs
2011 EPs
Albums produced by John Cale